Setor de Indústria e Abastecimento is an administrative region in the Federal District in Brazil.

See also
List of administrative regions of the Federal District

References

External links
 Regional Administration of Setor de Indústria e Abastecimento website
 Government of the Federal District website

Administrative regions of Federal District (Brazil)
Populated places established in 2005
2005 establishments in Brazil